Andres Ballinas (also known as Andy Lopez) is a German singer and songwriter.

He has written songs and was a featured singer for fellow German producers R.I.O., Cascada, Carlprit, and Manian. He entered the Eurovision Song Contest in 2013 as the writer of Cascada’s “Glorious”.

He has written many songs with these artists and these songs charted throughout Europe.

Discography 
Singles (with DJ Manian)

 “Dance Dance”

Singles (with R.I.O.)

 “Thinking of You”

Solo Albums

 Besame (2000)

Solo Singles

 “Noche Del Amor” (2005)

References 

German musicians
Living people
German songwriters
Year of birth missing (living people)